Lonesome Lake could refer to:

United States
Lonesome Lake (Idaho), an alpine lake in Custer County, Idaho
Lonesome Lake (Montana), a lake located in Carbon County, Montana
Lonesome Lake (New Hampshire), a lake located in Franconia Notch in the White Mountains of New Hampshire
Lonesome Lake (Washington), a lake in the Mount Baker–Snoqualmie National Forest
Lonesome Lake (Wyoming), a lake in the Wind River Range

Canada
Lonesome Lake (British Columbia), a lake located in Tweedsmuir South Provincial Park, British Columbia near Hunlen Falls